Natural childbirth is childbirth without routine medical interventions, particularly anesthesia. Natural childbirth arose in opposition to the techno-medical model of childbirth that has recently gained popularity in industrialized societies. Natural childbirth attempts to minimize medical intervention, particularly the use of anesthetic medications and surgical interventions such as episiotomies, forceps and ventouse deliveries and caesarean sections. Natural childbirth may occur during a physician or midwife attended hospital birth, a midwife attended homebirth, or an unassisted birth. The term "natural childbirth" was coined by obstetrician Grantly Dick-Read upon publication of his book Natural Childbirth in the 1930s, which was followed by the 1942 Childbirth Without Fear.

History
Historically, most women gave birth at home without emergency medical care available. The "natural" rate of maternal mortality—meaning without surgical or pharmaceutical intervention—has been estimated at 1,500 per 100,000 births. In the United States circa 1900, before the introduction and improvement of modern medical technologies, there were about 700 maternal deaths per 100,000 births (.7%).

At the onset of the Industrial Revolution, giving birth at home became more difficult due to congested living spaces and dirty living conditions. This drove urban and lower-class women to newly available hospitals, while wealthy and middle-class women continued to labor at home. In the early 1900s there was an increasing availability of hospitals, and more women began going into the hospital for labor and delivery. In the United States, the middle classes were especially receptive to the medicalization of childbirth, which promised a safer and less painful labor. The ability to birth without pain was part of the early feminist movement. The use of childbirth drugs began in 1847 when Scottish obstetrician James Young Simpson introduced chloroform as an anesthetic during labor, but only the richest and most powerful women (such as Queen Victoria) had access. In the late 1800s, feminists in the United States and United Kingdom began to demand drugs for pain relief during childbirth. However, well into the first decades of the 20th century, unmedicated birth assisted by midwives was still commonplace in rural areas and some urban centers as well.

The term "natural childbirth" was coined by obstetrician Grantly Dick-Read upon publication of his book Natural Childbirth in 1933. In the book, Dick-Read defined the term as the absence of any intervention that would otherwise disturb the sequence of labor. The book argued that because of "civilized" British women fear birth the birthrate was dropping, and if women were not to fear birth, birthing would be easier since fear creates tension which, in turn, causes pain. In 1942, Dick-Read published Revelation of Childbirth (which was later retitled Childbirth without Fear), advocating natural childbirth, which became an international bestseller. In the late 1940s, he brought his ideas to America, but saw similar ideas with differing names –  “pain-free birth” and “prepared childbirth” – were already gaining traction. The appeal of natural childbirth rested in the idea that merging physiological, psychological, social, and spiritual aspects of reproduction would create the best comprehensive care.

The Lamaze method gained popularity in the United States after Marjorie Karmel wrote about her experiences in her 1959 book Thank You, Dr. Lamaze, and with the formation of the American Society for Psychoprophylaxis in Obstetrics (currently Lamaze International) by Karmel and Elisabeth Bing. The Bradley method of natural childbirth (also known as "husband-coached childbirth"), a method of natural childbirth developed in 1947 by Robert A. Bradley, M.D., was popularized by his book Husband-Coached Childbirth, first published in 1965.

In the 1970s, natural childbirth became a movement associated with feminism and consumerism, stressing obstetrics' lack of concern for the whole person and technology a method for controlling women's bodies. Michel Odent and midwives such as Ina May Gaskin promoted birthing centers, water birth, and homebirth as alternatives to the hospital model. Frédérick Leboyer is often mistakenly believed to have advocated for water births, but he actually rejected the alternative as he felt it was not beneficial to the health of the baby. In 1976, Gaskin wrote the book Spiritual Midwifery, which described the beauty and power of unmedicated home births.

Psychological aspects
Many women consider natural birth empowering and gives women more control in the birth process, pushing against the paternalistic medical establishment. Studies show that skin-to-skin contact between a mother and her newborn immediately after birth is beneficial for both mother and baby.  A review done by the World Health Organization found that skin-to-skin contact between mothers and babies after birth reduces crying, improves mother-infant interaction, and helps mothers to breastfeed successfully. They recommend that neonates be allowed to bond with the mother during their first two hours after birth, the period that they tend to be more alert than in the following hours of early life.

Alternatives to intervention
Instead of medical interventions, a variety of non-invasive methods are employed during natural childbirth to ease the mother's pain. Many of these techniques stress the importance of "a mind-body connection," which the techno-medical model of birth does not. These techniques include hydrotherapy, massage, relaxation therapy, hypnosis, breathing exercises, acupressure for labor, transcutaneous electrical nerve stimulation (TENS), vocalization, visualization, mindfulness and water birth. Other approaches include movement, walking, and different positions (for example, using a birthing ball), hot and cold therapy (for example, using hot compresses and/or cold packs), and receiving one-on-one labor support like that provided by a midwife or doula. However, natural childbirth proponents maintain that pain is a natural and necessary part of the labor process, and should not automatically be regarded as entirely negative. In contrast to the pain of injury and disease, they believe that the pain of childbirth is a sign that the female body is functioning as it is meant to.

Birth positions favored in natural childbirth—including squatting, hands and knees, or suspension in water—contrast with the lithotomy position (woman in hospital bed on her back with legs in stirrups), which has consistently been shown to slow and complicate labor. 

Methods to reduce tearing during natural childbirth (instead of an episiotomy) include managing the perineum with counter-pressure, hot compresses, and pushing the baby out slowly.

Preparation
Some women take birth education classes such as Lamaze or the Bradley Method to prepare for a natural childbirth. Several books are also available with information to help women prepare. A midwife or doula may include preparation for a natural birth as part of the prenatal care services. However, a  study published in 2009 suggests that preparation alone is not enough to ensure an intervention-free outcome.

Prevalence of medical intervention in the U.S.
In the U.S in 2007: 93% of mothers used electronic fetal monitoring; 63% used
epidurals; 55% had their membranes ruptured; 53% received oxytocin to stimulate labor progress; and 52% received episiotomies.

Criticisms

Some studies argue that the push towards 'natural childbirth' in Western countries is exaggerated, and can harm women. Some women also express shame when not able to have a “natural birth,” feeling that their bodies may be defective or lessen the experiences of individuals using assisted reproductive technologies, or who are adoptive parents and parents who use surrogates.

See also
 Bradley method of natural childbirth
 Childbirth positions
 Early postnatal hospital discharge
 Home birth
 Hypnotherapy in childbirth
 Natural Hospital Birth, 2011 book
 Squatting position

References

Further reading
 Durand, Mark A. (1992). "The Safety of Home Birth: The Farm Study". American Journal of Public Health.
 Sakala, C., M. Corry, and H. Goer (2004). "Harms of Cesarean Versus Vaginal Birth". New York: Childbirth Connection. Full report available at
 Simkin, P. (1992). "Just another day in a woman's life? Nature and consistency of women's long term memories of their first birth experience". Birth 19:64–81.
 Thompson, Craig (2005). "Consumer Risk Perceptions in a Community of Reflexive Doubt". Journal of Consumer Research.

 
Childbirth
Midwifery